Ionikos Football Club or Ionikos Nikaia is a Greek professional football club based in Nikaia, Piraeus, Greece, currently competing in the Super League Greece, the top-tier of the Greek football league system.

From 1989 to 2007 Ionikos spent 16 out of 18 seasons in the Super League.  During that span Ionikos finished as high as 5th-place in the league (on two occasions), was a finalist in the Greek Cup, and participated in the UEFA Cup.

The club's colours are blue and white.

History

Foundation
Ionikos was established in 1965, from a merger of local clubs Nikaia Sports Union and Aris Piraeus, with Alex Meraklidis as new club's first president.  The club's early years were not easy, but, with the support of its fans, Ionikos slowly improved through the 1970s and 1980s and eventually reached the top division in 1989.

The club's first promotion to the top flight was accompanied by unexpected problemsDimitris Melissanidis withdrew as chairman, and the club needed 50 million drachmas to participate in the championship.  Businessman Nikolaos Kanellakis stepped forward to provide the needed sum and become the club's new chairman.

Nikos Kanellakis
Kanellakis' arrival would be the beginning of the club's greatest erafrom the 1989 promotion, Ionikos would spend 16 of the next 18 seasons in the Greek top flight, up until 2007, and during that time the team would finish as high as 5th-place in the league (on two occasions),  reach a Greek Cup Final, and compete in the UEFA Cup.

Greek Cup Final 2000

Ionikos' UEFA Cup appearance came in the 1999–00 seasonthe opposition was French side Nantes, and Ionikos lost both home and away matches, 1–3 and 0–1, respectively.  Ionikos reached the Greek Cup Final later that same season, where they came up against traditional power AEK, and, despite a valiant Ionikos effort, AEK won the match, 3–0.

On 21 April 2004 Ionikos experienced the most tragic moment of his history, when Nikolaos Kanellakis, the club's chairman for 14 years, died.  Hundreds of Ionikos supportersas well as other sports fansattended Kanellakis' funeral, where the flag of Ionikos covered the coffin of the late chairman.  Nikolaos' son Christos took his father's place as chairman.

Relegation to Second League

Ionikos' long run in the top flight ended in the 2006–07 season, when the team finished in 16th-place in the Super League and was relegated back to Beta Ethniki.  Ionikos has spent the last two seasons in Beta Ethniki, finishing 5th and 4th place, respectively, as the club tries to rejoin the top flight.

Return to the Top League
For the upcoming season, 2021–22, they will compete once again in the Greek top league, 2021–22 Super League Greece, having gained promotion, and after successfully getting licensed to compete in the top league's new season.

Stadium

Ionikos plays its home matches at Neapolis Public Stadium, located in Nikaia, a suburb of Piraeus.  The stadium was completed in 1965, and had its latest redevelopment in 2000.  It currently has a seating capacity of 4,999, but record attendance is 6,565 for a match against Olympiacos in 1990.

Ionikos' organized supporters gather in Gate 3 at Neapoli Stadium.

Supporters and rivals

While Ionikos was competing in the lower divisions there were two main supporters' groupsthe Association of Ionikos Nikaias Supporters and the Fan Club of Agios Georgios.

On Ionikos's promotion to the top division the Association of Ionikos Nikaias Supporters Rangers Club was formedor Rangers Club, for shortwith headquarters in Elefterias Square in Korydallos.  Before Ionikos's first match in the top flight the Rangers Club organised a parade of 2,000 supporters from outside Rangers' headquarters to Stavros Mavrothalassitis Stadium, where Ionikos played its first three home matches of the 1989–90 season.  Two years later the supporters' club offices moved to Neapolis, and then in 1996 to Nikaia, before returning to Neapolis in 1999.  A second branch was established in Nikaia in 2004.

Ionikos fans have a rivalry with the fans of the other topic club of Nikaia, Proodeftiki.

Ionikos fans have rivalries too with other nearby clubs, Egaleo, Atromitos and Kallithea.

The Derby of Kokkinia

The football matches between Ionikos and Proodeftiki are called «The Derby of Kokkinia» or «The Derby of Nikaia».

Players

Current squad

Other players under contract

Former players

  Eduard Stoyanov
  Ildefons Lima
  Toni Lima
  Craig Brewster

List of managers

Ionikos managers from 1992 and henceforth.

Honours

Domestic

League titles
 Super League 2 (Second Division)   
 Winners (2): 1993–94, 2020–21
 Gamma Ethniki (Third Division)   
 Winners (2): 1976–77, 1981–82 (Group 1)
 Delta Ethniki (Fourth Division)   
 Winners (1): 2012–13 (Group 9)
 Piraeus FCA Championship (Local Championship)   
 Winners (1): 1976–77

Cups
Greek Cup
 Runners-up (1): 1999–00
 Piraeus FCA Cup (Local Cup)   
 Winners (1): 1981–82

Season-by-season

Since 1965–66:

 18 seasons in Super League Greece
 1 season in Super League Greece 2
 25 seasons in Football League Greece
 8 seasons in Gamma Ethniki
 2 seasons in Delta Ethniki
 4 seasons in Piraeus Football Clubs Association

Club records

Alpha Ethniki / Super League
Last Update 5 March 2023

First participation: 1989–90
Total participations: 17
Wins: 166
Draws: 154
Losses: 240
Goals Scored: 611
Goals Conceded: 812
Record Win: Ionikos 5–0 OFI Crete in 1997–98
Record Loss: AEK Athens 6–0 Ionikos in 1995–96, Olympiacos 6–0 Ionikos in 2002–03, PAOK 6–0 Ionikos in 2022–23

Beta Ethniki

First participation: 1965–66
Total participations: 23
Wins: 299
Draws: 224
Losses: 259
Goals Scored: 925
Goals Conceded: 849
Record Win: Ionikos 8–0 Bizani in 1966–67, Ionikos 8–0 Anagennisi Artas in 1974–75
Record Loss: Vyzas 7–0 Ionikos in 1971–72

Individual records

Appearances

Goals

Crest and colors
The emblem of the club is a resting star and its colors are blue and white.

Original & Alternative strips & colours

Original kit

Kit evolution

Kit manufacturers and sponsors

European record

References

External links
 Official website 
 Rangers – Supporters' club site 
 Neapolis Public Stadium at stadia.gr 

 
Association football clubs established in 1965
Football clubs in Attica
1965 establishments in Greece
Nikaia-Agios Ioannis Rentis
Ionikos Nikaias
Gamma Ethniki clubs